The Miss Pepperpot is a crossbred variety chicken. It is the result of breeding a Rhode Island Red with a Marans and a Plymouth Rock chicken.

References 

Chicken crossbreeds